Charles-Alfred Canivet (10 February 1839, in Valognes – 1911 ibid) was a 19th-century French poet, journalist, novelist, and storyteller.

A secretary by Amédée Thierry, he wrote a daily column for the Soleil under the pseudonym "Jean de Nivelle". After trying the theater, he left numerous literary works in the form of stories, novels and poems.

Works 
1863: Une Fauvette et deux merles, comedy in 1 act and in prose, Caen, E. Alliot;
1866: Chants libres, poésies, Caen, Legost-Clérisse;
1871: Histoires extravagantes, Paris, Mauger, Capart et Cie;
1875: La Prise de Sidney Smith en 1796, Paris, bureau du Journal de Paris;
1877: Jean Dagoury, Paris, E. Plon;
1878: Croquis et paysages, sonnets, Paris, A. Lemerre;
1879: Constance Giraudel, Paris, bureaux de la Presse;
1880: Nouveaux contes en vers et poésies variées, Paris, G. Chamerot;
1882: Pauvres diables, Paris, G. Charpentier;
1883: Le Long de la côte, Paris, A. Lemerre;
1884: Les Colonies perdues, Paris, Jouvet;
1885: La Nièce de l'organiste, Paris, E. Plon, Nourrit et Cie,;
1885: Les Hautemanière, Paris, P. Ollendorff;
1888: Pilote-Major, Paris, N. Martinet;
1888: La ferme des Gohel, Paris, C. Marpon et E. Flammarion;
1889: Contes de la mer et des grèves, Paris, Jouvet;
1889: Après la tempête, poésie, Paris, P. Mouillot;
1890: L'Amant de Rébecca, Paris, E. Plon, Nourrit et Cie;
1891: Lise Heurtevent, Paris, M. Dreyfous, 1891 (also published as a feuilleton in Le Figaro between 30 March 1891 and 2 June 1891);
1891: Contes du vieux pilote, Paris, Jouvet;
1891: Mademoiselle Maréchal ; La Petite Sœur ; L'Élection d'un maire, Paris, V. Havard;
1896: Enfant de la mer, Paris, E. Flammarion;
undated: Fils de pêcheur, Paris, bureaux du Journal des voyages''.

19th-century French poets
19th-century French journalists
French male journalists
19th-century French dramatists and playwrights
1839 births
Writers from Normandy
1911 deaths
19th-century French male writers